William Kenny VC (24 August 1880 – 10 January 1936) was an Irish recipient of the Victoria Cross, the highest and most prestigious award for gallantry in the face of the enemy that can be awarded to British and Commonwealth forces.

Victoria Cross
Kenny was 34 years old, and a Drummer in the 2nd Battalion, The Gordon Highlanders, British Army during the First World War when the following deed took place for which he was awarded the VC.

On 23 October 1914 near Ypres, Belgium, Drummer Kenny rescued wounded men on five occasions under very heavy fire. Twice previously he had saved machine-guns by carrying them out of action, and on numerous occasions he conveyed urgent messages under very dangerous circumstances over fire-swept ground.

Other honours

In addition to the Victoria Cross, Kenny earned the rank of Drum-Major and was also awarded the following medals: Queen's South Africa Medal with bars, King's South Africa Medal with bars, 1914 Star with bar, British War Medal, Victory Medal with oak-leaf, Delhi Durbar Medal, and the Cross of St George (Russia).

On 20 March 1999 the grave of William Kenny received a new headstone in the Corps of Commissionaires plot at Brookwood Cemetery, arranged by The Gordon Highlanders London Association (Lt Col. M.H. Burge). Kenny was buried in 1936 but unfortunately the original marker was lost and until this stone was placed, Kenny was not otherwise commemorated.

His Victoria Cross and other medals are on displayed at the Gordon Highlanders Museum, Aberdeen, Scotland.

References

Irish Winners of the Victoria Cross (Richard Doherty & David Truesdale, 2000)
Monuments to Courage (David Harvey, 1999)
The Register of the Victoria Cross (This England, 1997)
VCs of the First World War: 1914 (Gerald Gliddon, 1994)

External links
Location of grave and VC medal (Brookwood Cemetery)
The Brookwood Cemetery Society (Known Holders of the Victoria Cross Commemorated in Brookwood Cemetery)

1880 births
1936 deaths
Irish soldiers in the British Army
British military musicians
Gordon Highlanders soldiers
British Army personnel of the Second Boer War
British Army personnel of World War I
Irish World War I recipients of the Victoria Cross
Burials at Brookwood Cemetery
Recipients of the Cross of St. George
People from Drogheda
British Army recipients of the Victoria Cross
Irish recipients of the Victoria Cross